Adina Sabina Giurgiu (born 17 August 1994) is a Romanian women's football defender who plays for Sassuolo of the Italian Serie A.

Honours 
Olimpia Cluj
Winner
 Romanian Superliga (4): 2011–12, 2012–13, 2013–14, 2014–15
 Romanian Women's Cup (2): 2013–14, 2014–15

External links 
 

1994 births
Living people
Romanian women's footballers
Romania women's international footballers
Women's association football defenders
U.S. Sassuolo Calcio (women) players
Romanian expatriate sportspeople in Italy
Romanian expatriate footballers
Expatriate women's footballers in Italy
Serie A (women's football) players
FCU Olimpia Cluj players
Sportspeople from Arad, Romania